The Fall is a British crime drama television series filmed and set in Northern Ireland. The series is produced by Artists Studio and created by Allan Cubitt. It premiered in the Republic of Ireland on RTÉ at 9:30 pm on 12 May 2013, and in the United Kingdom on BBC Two at 9:00 pm on 13 May 2013. Starting in 2014, American streaming service Tubi TV started to release the show for U.S. viewers as exclusive original series at its launch lineup of programming. In 2020, the series now airs on Ovation (American TV channel), an American cable channel privately owned by Hubbard Broadcasting. The series stars Gillian Anderson as DSI Stella Gibson, a senior Metropolitan Police Detective and Jamie Dornan as serial killer Paul Spector.

Series overview

Episodes

Series 1 (2013)
Gillian Anderson stars in the first series of The Fall, alongside Jamie Dornan, Bronagh Waugh, Niamh McGrady, John Lynch, Archie Panjabi, Stuart Graham, Ian McElhinney, Ben Peel, Frank McCusker, Michael McElhatton, and Laura Donnelly. It started broadcast in Ireland (RTÉ) on 12 May 2013, followed by the UK broadcast (BBC) on 13 May.

Series 2 (2014)
Gillian Anderson stars in the second series of The Fall, alongside Jamie Dornan, Bronagh Waugh, Niamh McGrady, John Lynch, Archie Panjabi, Stuart Graham, Aisling Franciosi, Valene Kane, Emmett J. Scanlan, Jonjo O'Neill, Colin Morgan, Bronagh Taggart, Karen Hassan, Nick Lee, Sean McGinley, Brian Milligan, and Séainín Brennan. It started broadcast in Ireland (RTÉ) on 9 November 2014, followed by the UK broadcast (BBC) on 13 November.

Series 3 (2016)
Gillian Anderson stars in the third series of The Fall, alongside Jamie Dornan, Bronagh Waugh, John Lynch, Aisling Franciosi, Valene Kane, Jonjo O'Neill, Colin Morgan, Aisling Bea, Richard Coyle, Barry Ward, Richard Clements, Ruth Bradley, Genevieve O'Reilly, Aidan McArdle, Denise Gough, Conor MacNeill, Luke Whoriskey and Krister Henriksson. It started broadcast in Ireland (RTÉ) on 25 September 2016, followed by the UK broadcast (BBC) on 29 September.

References

External links
 The Fall BBC episode guide
 The Fall on RTÉ
 The Fall on Netflix
 
 

Lists of British drama television series episodes
Lists of Irish drama television series episodes